Allen Stroud is a researcher and university lecturer at Coventry University. He is currently leading the Creative Futures project, a funded research partnership between Coventry University and the Defence Science and Technology Laboratory (DSTL). Previously, he was Course Leader for the BA Media (Hons) Top Up and BA (Hons) Media and Communications. Before that, he was the course leader for Film and Television Production and the Creative Writing for Publication degrees at Bucks New University. Up until the end of 2019, he was the editor of the British Fantasy Society Journal. He also composes instrumental music; however, Stroud is best known for his sci-fi fantasy novels and video game writing.  He was the 2017 and 2018 chair of Fantasycon, the annual convention of the British Fantasy Society, which hosts the British Fantasy Awards.

In 2017, Stroud completed a Ph.D. at the University of Winchester entitled An Investigation and Application of Writing Structures and World Development Techniques in Science Fiction and Fantasy.

In June 2019, Allen Stroud became Chair of the British Science Fiction Association, taking over from Donna Bond.

Video games 
Stroud first became known for his video game writing with his work on world-building and novelisation of Video games such as Elite: Dangerous. For Elite: Dangerous, he wrote six guidebooks that inform the fictional narrative within the game and also serve to help other writers with the novelisation of their stories within the game's world. He also became a founding and continuing host of Lave Radio, a free podcast related to Elite: Dangerous that started in February 2013. His novelisation of the Elite: Dangerous game world began after he completed a successful Kickstarter campaign for the novel, Elite: Lave Revolution. Stroud is now working on a team which is developing a role-playing game set in the Elite: Dangerous game world.

Stroud's next video game world-building and novelisation work occurred with the development of Chaos Reborn. For Chaos Reborn, he worked collaboratively with the game's designer, Julian Gollop, to devise history and lore for the game world.

In 2017, Stroud worked with Gollop and Jonas Kyratzes to develop the dystopian world in the game Phoenix Point. Many of Stroud's short stories for Phoenix Point have been made available to readers for free.

Books and stories 

Stroud has written for a variety of different short story anthologies. In 2016, his story "The Last Tank Commander" appeared in Crises and Conflicts from Newcon Press. Baen Books Editor David Afshariad selected this for the 2017 edition of The Year's Best Military & Adventure SF.

Stroud's story "Reader" appears in Alice Macklin's 2017 anthology Read This First.

In 2018, Stroud's story "Dancers" was included in 2001: An Odyssey in Words published by Newcon Press. This is an anthology published to commemorate the 100th birthday of the late Arthur C. Clarke and features work by Neil Gaiman, China Miéville, Peter Hamilton, Stephen Baxter (author), Alastair Reynolds and Pat Cadigan amongst others.

In 2020, Grimbold Books publishedForgotten Sidekicks which features Stroud's short story, "Saving Simon" - a spiritual successor to John Wagner's 1981 short story "Sinful Simon".

References

External links 

21st-century composers
21st-century British writers
Academics of Buckinghamshire New University
British fantasy writers
British magazine editors
British male writers
British male composers
British science fiction writers
Academics of Coventry University
Living people
People from High Wycombe
Video game writers
Year of birth missing (living people)
21st-century British male musicians